Kumar Subramaniam (born 26 November  1979) is a Malaysian field hockey player who played as a goalkeeper for the Malaysian national team.

He also played with the Tenaga Nasional Berhad HC in the Malaysia Hockey League. He wore the number 16 both for Tenaga Nasional Berhad HC and Malaysian hockey team.

International career
He is named as the goalkeeper for the Asian All-Stars 2010 along with Salman Akbar of Pakistan. He also named as the Best Goalkeeper for the 2009 Men's Hockey Asia Cup. In 2012 Kumar became the first goalkeeper from Malaysia playing in a foreign league. He played for Uttar Pradesh Wizards in the Hockey India League. Despite having been in the national team for more than a decade, the Tampin-born Kumar has never featured in the Olympics but has played in two world cups After 20 years, Kumar announced his retirement on 20 February 2020.

References

External links

1979 births
Living people
People from Negeri Sembilan
Malaysian sportspeople of Indian descent
Malaysian people of Tamil descent
Malaysian male field hockey players
Asian Games medalists in field hockey
Field hockey players at the 2002 Asian Games
Field hockey players at the 2006 Asian Games
Field hockey players at the 2010 Asian Games
Field hockey players at the 2014 Asian Games
2014 Men's Hockey World Cup players
Field hockey players at the 2018 Asian Games
2018 Men's Hockey World Cup players
Asian Games silver medalists for Malaysia
Asian Games bronze medalists for Malaysia
Commonwealth Games bronze medallists for Malaysia
Field hockey players at the 2006 Commonwealth Games
Commonwealth Games medallists in field hockey
Medalists at the 2002 Asian Games
Medalists at the 2010 Asian Games
Male field hockey goalkeepers
Expatriate field hockey players
Malaysian expatriates in India
Uttar Pradesh Wizards players
Southeast Asian Games gold medalists for Malaysia
Southeast Asian Games medalists in field hockey
Competitors at the 1999 Southeast Asian Games
Competitors at the 2017 Southeast Asian Games
Medallists at the 2006 Commonwealth Games